The French Broad and Atlantic Railway was a railroad that served western South Carolina in the late 19th century.

Creation
The French Broad and Atlantic was formed in January 1882 when the Edgefield, Trenton and Aiken Railroad was consolidated with the Atlantic and French Broad Valley Railroad

Consolidation
In October 1882, the French Broad and Atlantic was consolidated with the Atlantic and French Broad Valley Railroad Company (of North Carolina), the Morristown, Cumberland Gap and Ohio Railroad, the Morristown and Carolina Railroad, and the Cumberland Railway to form the Carolina, Cumberland Gap and Chicago Railway.

See also
 Atlantic and French Broad Valley Railroad
 Belton, Williamston and Easley Railroad
 Carolina and Cumberland Gap Railway
 Carolina, Cumberland Gap and Chicago Railway
 Edgefield Branch Railroad
 Edgefield, Trenton and Aiken Railroad

References

Defunct South Carolina railroads
Railway companies established in 1882
Railway companies disestablished in 1882